Kanal Kannan (born as V. Kannan) is an Indian actor, action choreographer and screenwriter who works in Tamil, Telugu, Malayalam, Kannada, and Hindi films. He has worked with actors Mammootty,Prithviraj , Unni Mukundan,Ajith Kumar, Vijay, Arjun Sarja and R. Sarath Kumar in many films. Stunt coordinators including Stun Siva, Peter Hein, Anal Arasu, K. Ganesh Kumar, Silva, Rajasekhar, Hari Dinesh, T. Ramesh and Thunder Jeeva have worked as fighters and assistants to him.

Personal life
Kannan has filed a case against his wife on April 2012 in a city family court to bring his wife Hemavathi who was living in separation from him due to some differences, back to his family.

Filmography

 1991 Cheran Pandiyan
 1991 Anbu Sangili
 1991 Putham Pudhu Payanam
 1992 Oor Mariyadhai
 1992 Mudhal Seethanam
 1992 Kizhakku Veluthachu
 1992 En Aasai Rasathi
 1992 Abhirami 
 1993 Suriyan Chandiran
 1993 Aranmanai Kili
 1993 Gokulam
 1994 Captain
 1994 Sakthivel
 1994 Priyanka
 1994 Manasu Rendum Pudhusu
 1994 Maindhan
 1994 Chinna Madam
 1994 Sevvanthi
 1994 Pudhusa Pootha Rosa
 1994 Nattamai
 1994 Kaviyam
 1994 Nila
 1994 Pudhiya Mannargal
 1995 Deva
 1995 Chinna Mani
 1995 Muthukulikka Vaariyala
 1995 Ellame En Rasathan
 1995 Pasumpon
 1995 Ilaiya Ragam
 1995 Nandhavana Theru
 1995 Chellakannu
 1995 Vishnu
 1995 Periya Kudumbam
 1995 Chandralekha
 1995 Muthu
 1995 Seethanam
 1995 Thotta Chinungi
 1995 Ayudha Poojai
 1995 Mannai Thottu Kumbidanum
 1996 Aruva Velu
 1996 Parambarai
 1996 Poove Unakkaga
 1996 Sengottai
 1996 Avathara Purushan
 1996 Manikkam
 1996 Namma Ooru Rasa
 1996 Avvai Shanmughi
 1996 Mr. Romeo
 1996 Panchalankurichi
 1996 Selva
 1997 Sakthi
 1997 Hitler
 1997 Bharathi Kannamma
 1997 Aravindhan
 1997 Suryavamsam
 1997 Adimai Sangili
 1997 Samrat
 1997 Porkkaalam
 1998 Rathna
 1998 Desiya Geetham
 1999 Thulladha Manamum Thullum
 1999 Adutha Kattam
 1999 Padayappa
 1999 Minsara Kanna
 1999 Nenjinile
 1999 Oruvan
 1999 Nee Varuvai Ena
 1999 Jodi
 1999 Hello
 1999 Mudhalvan
 1999 Pattali
 2000 Annayya (Telugu)
 2000 Thirunelveli
 2000 Narasimham
 2000 Good Luck
 2000 Sudhandhiram
 2000 Mugavaree
 2000 Unnai Kodu Ennai Tharuven
 2000 Pennin Manathai Thottu
 2000 Yuvakudu
 2000 Maayi
 2000 Uyirile Kalanthathu
 2000 Azaad (Telugu)
 2000 Priyamanavale
 2000 Ennavale
 2000 Dada Sahib (Malayalam)
 2001 Friends
 2001 Eduruleni Manishi (Telugu)
 2001 Karumadikkuttan (Malayalam)
 2001 Badri
 2001 Citizen
 2001 Poovellam Un Vasam
 2001 Rakshasa Rajavu (Malayalam)
 2001 Alli Thandha Vaanam
 2001 Nayak: The Real Hero (Hindi)
 2001 Manadhai Thirudivittai
 2001 Hanuman Junction (Telugu)
 2001 Raavanaprabhu (Malayalam)
 2002 Seema Simham (Telugu)
 2002 Red
 2002 Charlie Chaplin
 2002 Roja Kootam
 2002 Phantom (2002 film) (Malayalam)
 2002 Sri Bannari Amman
 2002 Junior Senior
 2002 Ezhumalai
 2002 Raja
 2002 Samurai
 2002 Youth
 2002 Karmegham
 2002 Ivan
 2002 King
 2002 Five Star
 2002 En Mana Vaanil
 2002 Villain
 2002 Virumbugiren
 2003 Kadhaludan
 2003 Manasellam
 2003 Ennai Thalatta Varuvala
 2003 Parasuram
 2003 Whistle
 2003 Eera Nilam
 2003 Diwan
 2003 Three Roses
 2003 Anjaneya
 2003 Vishnu (Telugu)
 2004 Kadamba (Kannada)
 2004 Gambeeram
 2004 Aethiree
 2004 Jana
 2004 Sullan
 2004 Singara Chennai
 2004 Madurey
 2004 Sathyam
 2004 M. Kumaran S/O Mahalakshmi
 2004 Manmadhan
 2005 Aayudham
 2005 Bunny (Telugu)
 2005 6'2
 2005 Bhadra (Telugu)
 2005 Kana Kandaen
 2005 Andarivaadu (Telugu)
 2005 Anbe Aaruyire
 2005 Ghajini
 2005 Bageeratha (Telugu)
 2005 Bambara Kannaley
 2005 Mahanandi (Telugu)
 2005 Sandakozhi
 2006 Saravana
 2006 Lakshmi (Telugu)
 2006 Yuga
 2006 Asthram (Telugu)
 2006 Thimiru
 2006 Stalin (Telugu)
 2006 Chinnodu (Telugu)
 2006 The Don (Malayalam)
 2006 Ilavattam
 2006 Varalaru
 2006 Thalaimagan
 2006 Vallavan
 2006 Chennai Kadhal
 2007 Deepavali
 2007 Pori
 2007 Thullal
 2007 Evadaithe Nakenti (Telugu)
 2007 En Uyirinum Melana
 2007 Dhee (Telugu)
 2007 Lakshyam (Telugu)
 2007 Malaikottai
 2007 Thulasi (Telugu)
 2007 Black Cat (Malayalam)
 2008 Gaja
 2008 Bheema
 2008 Kaalai
 2008 Sadhu Miranda
 2008 Singakutty
 2008 Dasavatharam
 2008 Sathyam
 2008 Dhaam Dhoom
 2008 Ellam Avan Seyal
 2008 Hero (Telugu)
 2008 Saamida
 2008 Silambattam
 2009 Satrumun Kidaitha Thagaval
 2009 Ayan
 2009 Rajadhi Raja
 2009 Raju Maharaju
 2009 Current (Telugu)
 2009 Malai Malai
 2009 Kanthaswamy
 2009 Aadhavan
 2009 Amaravathi (Telugu)
 2009 Vettaikaaran
 2010 Aasal
 2010 Paiyaa
 2010 Sura
 2010 Pokkiri Raja (Malayalam)
 2010 Maanja Velu
 2010 Kaadhal Solla Vandhen
 2010 Moscowin Kavery
 2011 Ponnar-Shankar
 2011 Engeyum Kadhal
 2011 Ra.One (Hindi)
 2011 Thambi Vettothi Sundaram
 2011 Osthe
 2012 Nippu (Telugu)
 2012 Mallu Singh (Malayalam)
 2012 The King & the Commissioner (Malayalam)
 2012 Hero (Malayalam)
 2013 Naayak (Telugu)
 2013 Samar
 2013 Kammath & Kammath
 2013 Mirchi (Telugu)
 2013 Zila Ghaziabad (Hindi)
 2013 Thirumathi Thamizh
 2013 Mr. Pellikoduku (Telugu)
 2013 Tadakha (Telugu)
 2013 Policegiri (Hindi)
 2013 Shortcut Romeo (Hindi)
 2013 Adda (Telugu)
 2013 D Company (Telugu)
 2013 Phata Poster Nikhla Hero (Hindi)
 2013 Ramayya Vasthavayya (Telugu)
 2013 Doosukeltha (Telugu)
 2013 Singh Saab The Great (Hindi)
 2014 Legend (Telugu)
 2014 Thirumanam Ennum Nikkah
 2014 Irumbu Kuthirai
 2014 Poojai
 2015 Aambala
 2015 Isai
 2015 Killadi
 2015 Anegan
 2015 Rombha Nallavan Da Nee
 2015 Vaalu
 2015 Adhibar
 2016 Saagasam
 2016 Sowkarpettai
 2016 Vaaliba Raja
 2016 Mudinja Ivana Pudi
 2016 Vaaimai
 2016 Wagah
 2016 Uchathula Shiva
 2016 Kaththi Sandai
 2017 Si3
 2017 Sathya (Malayalam)
 2017 Sakka Podu Podu Raja
 2017 Vaigai Express
 2017 Khaidi No. 150
 2017 Yaar Ivan
 2018 Saamy 2
 2019 Charlie Chaplin 2
 2019 Sandaikkari
 2019 Kaaki Da
 2019 Kanniyum Kaalaiyum Sema Kadhal
 2019 Sankarapuram
 2019 Vinaya Vidheya Rama (Telugu)
 2019 Yajamana (Kannada)
 2019 Jack & Daniel (Malayalam)
 2019 My Santa (Malayalam)
 2021 Naanum Single Thaan
2021 Jai Bhim
 2022 Carbon
 2022 Yutha Satham
 2022 Cobra
 2022 Paamban
 2022 Aayiram Jenmangal
 2022 Bommai
 2022 Mark Antony
 2022 Kaduva (Malayalam)
 2023 Pattathu Arasan
 2023 Therkathi Veeran

Actor

 1989 Anbu Kattalai as Henchman (special appearance)
 1990 Paattali Magan as Henchman (special appearance)
 1993 Aranmanai Kili as Henchman (special appearance)
 1994 Captain as Auto Driver (special appearance)
 1994 Naatamai as Silambam player (special appearance)
 1995 Ellame En Rasathan as Rogue (special appearance)
 1995 Thai Thangai Paasam (special appearance)
 1996 Avvai Shanmughi as Henchman (special appearance)
 1997 Porkkaalam as Postman (special appearance)
 1998 Kadhal Mannan as Taxi Driver (special appearance)
 1998 Sollamale as Coconut Seller (special appearance)
 1999 Padayappa as Village man (a special appearance)
 1999 Nee Varuvai Ena as Bus Passenger (special appearance)
 1999 Mudhalvan as Auto Driver (special appearance)
 2000 Mugavaree (special appearance)
 2000 Pennin Manathai Thottu as Pickpocket (special appearance)
 2000 Uyirile Kalanthathu as Kanal
 2002 Red (special appearance)
 2002 Vivaramana Aalu as Karuppu (in a special appearance)
 2001 Citizen as Stunt Dupe (special appearance)
 2001 Manadhai Thirudivittai as Rogue (special appearance)
 2002 Charlie Chaplin as Rouge (special appearance)
 2002 Raja as Henchman (special appearance)
 2002 Ivan as Henchman (special appearance)
 2002 Villain as Henchman (special appearance)
 2003 Diwan as Referee (special appearance)
 2004 Aethiree as Police Driver (special appearance)
 2004 Sullan as Rouge (special appearance)
 2004 Singara Chennai Auto Driver 
 2006 Thimiru as Dancer (special appearance in the song Oppurane Oppurane)
 2006 Vallavan (special appearance)
 2007 Pori as Jackpot Ayyanardurai (special appearance)
 2007 Madurai Veeran as Kanal (special appearance)
 2007 Sivaji as Kanal Kannan (in a special appearance as a Henchman)
 2007 En Uyirinum Melana (special appearance in the song Kaakka Kaakka)
 2007 Malaikottai as Mattu Ravi (special appearance)
 2008 Silambattam as Pulippal Boopathy (in a special appearance as a Henchman)
 2008 Bheema as Rogue (special appearance)
 2009 Satrumun Kidaitha Thagaval as Shiva
 2011 Sankarankovil as Kathir
 2013 Onbadhule Guru (special appearance in the song Alaiyadhe Summa Summa)
 2015 Aambala as Henchman
 2015 Killadi as Kangu Kannan (in a special appearance as a Thief)
 2015 Rombha Nallavan Da Nee as Henchman
 2016 Vaaliba Raja as Romantic Kannan (guest appearance)
 2016 Uchathula Shiva
 2017 Sakka Podu Podu Raja as himself (special appearance)
 2022 Etharkkum Thunindhavan as a passerby

Writer
 2011  Sankarankovil (also producer - uncredited)

Extra Fighter
 1985 Pattuchelai
 1989 Enne Petha Raasa
 1990 Pachai Kodi
 1990 Maruthu Pandi

Awards 

Won
 1995 Tamil Nadu State Film Award for Best Stunt Coordinator - Muthu
 1996 Tamil Nadu State Film Award for Best Stunt Coordinator - Selva
 1996 Dinakaran Award for Best Stunt Master - Selva
 1999 Dinakaran Award for Best Stunt for Stunt Choreographer - Padayappa & Mudhalvan
 1999 Nandi Award for Best Fight Master - Annayya
 2000 Dinakaran Award for Best Stunt Master - Maayi
 2000 Nandi Award for Best Fight Master - Azad
 2004 Medimix-Dinakaran Award for Best Stunt Master - M. Kumaran S/O Mahalakshmi
 2004 Filmfare Award for Best Action Director - South - Madurey
 2005 Tamil Nadu State Film Award for Best Stunt Coordinator - Sandakozhi
 2006 Vijay Award for Best Stunt Director - Varalaru: The History of Godfather
 2008 Tamil Nadu State Film Award for Best Stunt Coordinator - Silambattam
 2008 Anada Vikatan Award for Best Stunt Choreography - Bheema
 2009 Edison Awards For Best Action - Ayan
 2009 Maha Fine Arts for Best Stunt - Aadhavan
 2009 V4 Popular Film Awards Best Stunt - Aadhavan
Nominated
 2007 Vijay Award for Best Stunt Director - Deepavali
 2008 Vijay Award for Best Stunt Director - Dasavathaaram
 2008 Vijay Award for Best Stunt Director - Bheema
 2009 Vijay Award for Best Stunt Director - Ayan
 2009 Vijay Award for Best Stunt Director - Vettaikaaran
 2010 Vijay Award for Best Stunt Director - Paiyaa
 2014 Vijay Award for Best Stunt Director - Poojai
 2015 Edison Awards For Best Action - Aambala

References

External links 

Male actors from Tamil Nadu
Tamil male actors
Living people
Indian action choreographers
20th-century Indian male actors
21st-century Indian male actors
Male actors in Hindi cinema
Male actors in Kannada cinema
Male actors in Malayalam cinema
Male actors in Telugu cinema
Indian male film actors
People from Nagercoil
1969 births